Klipheuwel is a village of about 2,300 people situated  north of Durbanville, in the Western Cape province of South Africa. In the 1920s it was the site of a shortwave transmitter constructed by the Marconi Company as part of the Imperial Wireless Chain. It remains today the site of the transmitter for the Cape Talk AM radio station.

Roads 

Klipheuwel is located between the R302 and R304 regional routes. The R302 (Malmesbury Road) connects to Durbanville in the south-west and Malmesbury in the north, whilst the R304 (Philadelphia Road) connects to Philadelphia and Atlantis in the north-west and Stellenbosch in the south-east. The R304 also provides Klipheuwel access to the N1 (to the south) and N7 freeways (to the west).

References

Populated places in the City of Cape Town